Cathy is a feminine given name. It is a pet form of Catherine or Cathleen.

Cathy may refer to:

People

Artists
 Cathy de Monchaux, British sculptor
 Cathy Guisewite, American cartoonist who created the comic strip Cathy in 1976
 Cathy Sisler, American artist
 Cathy Wilcox, Australian cartoonist and children‘s book illustrator

In sports
 Cathy Baker, New Zealand field hockey player
 Cathy Freeman, Australian track and field athlete
 Cathy Gauthier, Canadian curler and broadcaster
 Cathy O'Brien, American long-distance runner
 Cathy Rattray-Williams, Jamaican sprinter
 Cathy Rigby, American gymnast and actress
 Cathy Sulinski, American javelin thrower
 Cathy Townsend (born 1937), Canadian ten-pin bowler

In acting
 Cathy Cavadini, American voice actress
 Cathy Downs, American film actress
 Cathy Jones, Canadian actress and comedian
 Cathy Keenan, Canadian actress
 Cathy O'Donnell, American actress
 Cathy Podewell, American actress
 Cathy Rigby, American actress and gymnast
 Cathy Silvers, the daughter of actor/comedian Phil Silvers
 Cathy Tyson, British actress
 Cathy Weseluck, Canadian voice actress

In music
 Cathy Davey, Irish singer/songwriter
 Cathy Fink & Marcy Marxer, musical partners

In other fields
 Cathy Cassidy, British author and illustrator
 Cathy Crowe, Canadian nurse and social activist
 Cathy Mason, Northern Irish politician
 Cathy Peattie, Scottish Labour politician
 Cathy Priest, Canadian professional bodybuilder and figure competitor
 Cathy Wood, American serial killer

Fictional characters
 the title character of Cathy (comic strip)
 Cathy Lane, on The Patty Duke Show, played by Patty Duke
 Cathy Linton, from Wuthering Heights
 Cathy Matthews, from the British soap opera Coronation Street
Cathy Simms, fictional character in The Office
 Cathy, fictional character in Palibhasa Lalake portrayed by Carmina Villarroel.

See also
 Cathee Dahmen (1945–1997), American model
 Catherina
 S. Truett Cathy (1921–2014), American businessman, investor, author, and philanthropist, founder of the fast food restaurant chain Chick-fil-A
 Bubba Cathy (born c. 1954), American billionaire businessman, son of the above
 Kathy, feminine given name

References

English feminine given names